Brooks Donald-Williams (born January 16, 1978) is an American basketball coach who is currently the head coach of the Louisiana–Monroe Warhawks women's basketball team.

Career
She was previously the head coach of the McNeese State Cowgirls basketball team, and an assistant women's basketball coach for Alabama. On April 11, 2019, Donald-Williams was named the head women's basketball coach at the University of Louisiana at Monroe.

Head coaching record

References 

1978 births
Living people
People from Jennings, Louisiana
Alabama Crimson Tide women's basketball coaches
American women's basketball coaches
Louisiana–Monroe Warhawks women's basketball coaches
McNeese Cowgirls basketball coaches
Mississippi State Bulldogs women's basketball players
Mississippi State University alumni
Basketball coaches from Louisiana
Memphis Tigers women's basketball coaches
Southern Miss Lady Eagles basketball coaches